Great Britain  competed at the 2019 World Aquatics Championships in Gwangju, South Korea from 12 to 28 July.

Medalists

Artistic swimming

Great Britain's artistic swimming team consisted of 2 athletes (2 female).

Women

Diving

Great Britain entered 13 divers.

Men

Women

Mixed

High diving

Great Britain qualified three male and one female high divers.

Men

Women

Open water swimming

Great Britain qualified three male and three female open water swimmers.

Men

Women

Mixed

Swimming

Great Britain entered 25 swimmers.

Men

Women

Mixed

 Legend: (*) = Swimmers who participated in the heat only.

References

World Aquatics Championships
2019
Nations at the 2019 World Aquatics Championships